= Bieberstedt Butte =

Summit in the U.S. state of Oregon

Coordinates: 42°24′37″N 122°28′24″W

Bieberstedt Butte is a summit in the U.S. state of Oregon. The elevation is 5,259 feet (1,603 m).

Bieberstedt Butte has the name of one Carl Bieberstedt.
